The 1997 Marshall Thundering Herd football team represented the Marshall University as a member of the East Division of the Mid-American Conference (MAC) during the 1997 NCAA Division I-A football season. Led by second-year head coach Bob Pruett, the Thundering Herd compiled an overall record of 10–3 with a mark of 7–1 in conference play, winning the MAC's East Division title. Marshall beat Toledo in MAC Championship Game to win the conference championship and then lost to Ole Miss in the Motor City Bowl. 

After winning the Southern Conference (SoCon) tile and the NCAA Division I-AA Football Championship in 1996, Marshall returned to NCAA Division I-A play for the first time since 1981 and the MAC for the time since 1968. The Thundering Herd played home games at Marshall University Stadium in Huntington, West Virginia.

Wide receiver Randy Moss and quarterback Chad Pennington were the centerpiece of an explosive offense. Moss caught 26 touchdown passes, at the time an NCAA Division I-A record, and was a unanimous first-team All-American. For the season, Moss had 96 receptions for 1,820 yards, won the Fred Biletnikoff Award as the nation's best wide receiver, and was a finalist for the Heisman Trophy, finishing fourth in the balloting, behind Ryan Leaf, Peyton Manning, and Charles Woodson, who won the award. Moss left Marshall with 168 receptions for 3,467 yards and a school record 53 touchdowns in two seasons.

The Herd became only the second team to win a conference championship in its first NCAA Division I-A (now FBS) season, following the 1992 Nevada Wolf Pack football team that won the Big West Conference. The feat was not repeated until 2014, when Georgia Southern won the Sun Belt Conference title.

Schedule

Roster

Game summaries

at West Virginia

After trailing 28–3, the Thundering Herd scored 28 straight to take a 31–28 lead into the 4th quarter. West Virginia responded with two fourth quarter touchdowns to win this much anticipated season opener, 42–31. Randy Moss had seven receptions for 85 yards and two touchdowns.

at Army

Randy Moss had five receptions for 186 yards and two touchdowns.

st Kent State

Randy Moss hauled in 8 receptions for 216 yards and 3 touchdowns.

Western Illinois

Randy Moss had 5 receptions for 52 yards and 2 touchdowns.

at Ball State

Randy Moss caught 13 passes for 205 yards and a school-record 5 touchdowns.

Akron

Randy Moss had 6 receptions for 107 yards and 2 touchdowns.

at Miami (OH)

Randy Moss had 10 receptions for 147 yards and a touchdown.

Eastern Michigan

Randy Moss had 8 receptions for 124 yards and a touchdown.

at Central Michigan

Randy Moss had 7 receptions for 193 yards and 2 touchdowns.

Bowling Green

Randy Moss had 7 receptions for 56 yards and a touchdown.

Ohio

Randy Moss had seven receptions for 101 yards and a touchdown.

Toledo (MAC Championship Game)

Randy Moss had seven receptions for 170 yards and three touchdowns.

vs. Ole Miss (Motor City Bowl)

Playing in its first bowl game since the 1948 Tangerine Bowl, Marshall lost a back-and-forth matchup with Ole Miss. Randy Moss had 6 receptions for 173 yards and a touchdown, including an 80-yard bomb from Chad Pennington, in his final collegiate game.

Awards and honors
Randy Moss – Fred Biletnikoff Award, Heisman Trophy Finalist (4th in Voting), Unanimous First-Team All-American, MAC Offensive Player of the Year

Team players in the 1998 NFL Draft

References

Marshall
Marshall Thundering Herd football seasons
Mid-American Conference football champion seasons
Marshall Thundering Herd football